The 2020 Women's Masters Basel was held from September 18 to 20 at the Curlingzentrum Region Basel in Arlesheim, Switzerland as part of the World Curling Tour. The event was held in a round-robin format with a purse of 32,000 CHF. It was the first women's event of the 2020–21 curling season.

Olympic Gold Medalists Anna Hasselborg from Sweden defeated Raphaela Keiser from Switzerland in the final to win the event. Hasselborg finished the round robin with a perfect 4–0 record and won all three of their playoff games to claim the title. Team Keiser upset Swiss champions Elena Stern in the semifinal to qualify for the final. Keiser is coached by two-time world champion Binia Feltscher.

The event was intended to use a triple-knockout format, like previous years, but due to the COVID-19 pandemic many teams had to opt-out of the event, leaving a smaller field than usual.

Teams
The teams are listed as follows:

Round-robin standings 
Final round-robin standings

Round-robin results
All draw times listed in Central European Time.

Draw 1
Friday, September 18, 9:00 am

Draw 2
Friday, September 18, 12:30 pm

Draw 3
Friday, September 18, 4:00 pm

Draw 4
Friday, September 18, 7:30 pm

Draw 5
Saturday, September 19, 9:00 am

Draw 6
Saturday, September 19, 12:30 pm

Draw 7
Saturday, September 19, 4:00 pm

Draw 8
Saturday, September 19, 7:30 pm

Playoffs

Source:

Quarterfinals
Sunday, September 20, 8:00 am

Semifinals
Sunday, September 20, 11:30 am

Final
Sunday, September 20, 3:00 pm

References

External links
Official Website
CurlingZone
Results from Women's Masters Basel

2020 in women's curling
Women's curling competitions in Switzerland
Sports competitions in Basel
2020 in Swiss sport
September 2020 sports events in Switzerland
21st century in Basel
Arlesheim
2020 in Swiss women's sport